HP ProCurve was the name of the networking division of Hewlett-Packard from 1998 to 2010 and associated with the products that it sold. The name of the division was changed to HP Networking in September 2010 after HP bought 3Com Corporation.

History
The HP division that became the HP ProCurve division began in Roseville, California, in 1979. Originally it was part of HP's Data Systems Division (DSD) and known as DSD-Roseville. Later, it was called the Roseville Networks Division (RND), then the Workgroup Networks Division (WND), before becoming the ProCurve Networking Business (PNB). The trademark filing date for the ProCurve name was February 25, 1998. On August 11, 2008 HP announced the acquisition of Colubris Networks, a maker of wireless networking products. This completed on October 1, 2008. In November 2008, HP ProCurve was moved into HP's largest business division, the Technology Services Group organization, with HP Enterprise Account Managers being compensated for sales.
In November 2009, HP announced its intent to acquire 3Com for $2.7B. In April 2010, HP completed its acquisition.

At Interop Las Vegas in April 2010, HP began publicly using HP Networking as the name for its networking division
Following HP's 2015 acquisition of Aruba Networks and the company's subsequent split later that year, HP Networks was combined with Aruba to form HPE's "Inteligent Edge" business unit under the Aruba Networks brand.

Products

A variety of different networking products have been made by HP. The first products were named EtherTwist while printer connectivity products carried the JetDirect name. As the EtherTwist name faded, most of HP's networking products were given AdvanceStack names. Later, the then-ProCurve division began to offer LAN switches, Core, Datacenter, Distribution, Edge, Web managed and Unmanaged Switches. The ProCurve was also used with Network Management, Routing and Security products.

Notable uses
The International Space Station makes use of customized HP switches (model 2524 Switches) sold while the HP division was known as ProCurve. CERN uses HP switches throughout their campus including providing the networking needs for the Large Hadron Collider.

See also
 Aruba Networks
 HP Networking Products
 ProCurve Products

References

 
Networking hardware
Networking hardware companies
Telecommunications equipment vendors
Networking companies of the United States
Hewlett-Packard products